L'eau rouge (French for The Red Water) is the second album by industrial band The Young Gods, released in September 1989 by Play It Again Sam Records. It is usually referred to as their masterpiece and was included in 1001 Albums You Must Hear Before You Die in 2005.

Reception

Accolades

Track listing

Personnel
Adapted from the L'eau rouge liner notes.

The Young Gods
 Cesare Pizzi – keyboards
 Use Hiestand – drums
 Franz Treichler – vocals

Production and additional personnel
 Michele Amar – programming
 Voco Fauxpas – engineering
 Roli Mosimann – production

Charts

Release history

Footnotes

External links
 
Album online on Radio3Net a radio channel of Romanian Radio Broadcasting Company

1989 albums
The Young Gods albums
Interscope Records albums
PIAS Recordings albums
Albums produced by Roli Mosimann
French-language albums